Stories in the Room: Michael Jackson's Thriller Album is a music podcast series that features conversations and demos with songwriters, producers, engineers, and musicians behind the Thriller album, about creating the music together in the famous Westlake Recording Studios in West Hollywood. The series is hosted by Anthony Marinelli and Steven Ray.

Series overview 
In connection with the 40th anniversary of the release of the studio album Thriller (released on November 29, 1982), the hosts invited key members of the team behind the album, to share their stories and inside details of how the music came together.

The hosts 
The podcast series is hosted by film composer Anthony Marinelli who programmed synthesizers for seven songs on the album and A&R veteran and film producer Steven Ray  who was Quincy Jones' assistant and the only person who was present in the studio every day during the recording of the album. As the multitrack production came together, each night Steven would drop off audiotapes with demoes of tracks for potential inclusion on the album, at Quincy Jones' house.

Format and production 
The podcast is released as both audio-only and video episodes. Each interview is segmented into episodes running from 8 to 16 minutes. Production started in 2022 during COVID-19, and the initial interviews were performed and recorded remotely, with each host in Los Angeles and the guests in their respective home or studio. Later on the interviews would be recorded live in Anthony Marinelli's studio, where many of the original synthesizers used on the album were set up and available for the guests to demonstrate the intricacies and details of various parts of the songs. Among the equipment that is being demoed is the Linndrum machine,the ARP 2600 synthesizer, Sequential Circuits Prophet 5 synthesizer, Synclavier II, Dr. Click sync unit, and the Minimoog Moog synthesizer. The remote recording sessions were produced by AudiVita Studios. The in-studio interviews were recorded by Ben Rachlis. All audio postproduction was completed at Audivita Studios by Shaun Hettinger and Jay Spang. The video episodes and graphics were shot, produced, edited, and designed by Ditlevfilms. The series is directed by award-winning director Christian D. Bruun.

Social media and celebrities 
Besides being distributed across most podcast networks such as Apple Podcasts, Spotify, iHeart, TuneIn through the RedCircle platform, the series has a strong social media component, with additional segments released several times a week on Instagram and YouTube. Livestream Q&A sessions are released regularly, featuring the guests of the episodes, with an opportunity for the audience participation. The social media campaign is created and edited by Dante Marinelli. The campaign has reached millions of accounts and many of the clips have garnered millions of views and count among their followers such celebrities as Questlove, John Mayer, DJ Khalil, Timbaland, Lauren Hill.

Audience and reception 
The series has garnered positive reviews from music journalists and articles on music websites and newspapers around the world, and massive views on social media sites, such as Instagram and TikTok. On Michael Jackson fan sites the podcast has beomce an important resource for content related to the music of the Thriller album. The podcast is currently in the top 10% of all podcasts, according to the podcast ratings website Listen Notes

Global ranking and popularity

Music and music history podcasts 

Sources: Rephonic, Chartable

The guests 
 Greg Phillinganes
 Steve Porcaro
 Julia Waters
 Maxine Waters
 Oren Waters
 Matt Forger
 Paul Jackson Jr.
 Larry Williams
 Lorraine Fields

References

External links 

 
Stories in the Room: Michael Jackson's Thriller Album on Apple podcast
Stories in the Room: Michael Jackson's Thriller Album on Podtail
Stories in the Room: Michael Jackson's Thriller Album on Scribd
Stories in the Room: Michael Jackson's Thriller Album on podcast24 in the UK

Music journalism
Infotainment
Audio podcasts
Video podcasts
2022 podcast debuts
Music podcasts
American podcasts